Maria Kanaval (born 19 March 1997) is a Belarusian handballer who plays as a left back for Dunărea Brăila and the Belarus national team.

Achievements  
Belarusian Championship: 
Winner: 2015, 2018
Silver Medalist: 2016, 2017, 2019, 2020

Achievements 
 All-Star Left Back of the Belarusian Championship: 2020

References

1997 births
Living people
People from Rahachow
Belarusian female handball players
Expatriate handball players
Belarusian expatriate sportspeople in Romania
Sportspeople from Gomel Region